Spuiten en Slikken (translated in English as Shoot and Swallow, referring to the different methods of taking drugs, as well as referring to the male orgasm and the act of swallowing semen during sex) was a 2005-2018 Dutch television program on public television about  sexuality and drugs. It has been shown on BNN and was highly controversial from the start because numerous drugs and sexual kinks were tried out on television, often with participation from the hosts.

In the show, discussions about sex and drugs take place with weekly guests. The discussions are led by Nicolette Kluijver . Filemon Wesselink has tried several types of drugs during the shows and showed and told about the effects they had. In later seasons, Dennis Storm did sex experiments in the show. The show first aired October 10, 2005 and ended in 2018, though its YouTube channel still continues.

Sources

External links
Spuiten en Slikken on BNN
Episode with English subtitles
Spuiten en Slikken at IMDb

Dutch television talk shows
Dutch documentary television series
2005 Dutch television series debuts
2018 Dutch television series endings
Sex education television series
Television shows about drugs
Television controversies in the Netherlands
Obscenity controversies in television
NPO 3 original programming